Neeraj Kundan is the National President of NSUI, the student wing of Indian National Congress. Neeraj Kundan was appointed as the National President of NSUI by former Congress President Rahul Gandhi.

Early life 
Neeraj Kundan comes from a middle class family, where his father retired from government services.

Political career 
Kundan's political career started with a run and successful election as the President of Law School, Jammu University in 2009. He became National Delegate in 2011 and after two years, he became the 2nd elected NSUI President for Jammu & Kashmir.
In 2017 he was the In-charge of Punjab, Rajasthan, and Delhi. Under his leadership, NSUI won in Punjab University and Rajasthan University. He has also served as a member of the Campaign Committee of the Congress party in Jammu and Kashmir for the upcoming Lok Sabha elections.

References

Living people
Indian National Congress politicians from Jammu and Kashmir
Year of birth missing (living people)
National Students' Union of India